The Soci is a left tributary of the river Siret in Romania. It discharges into the Siret near Pâncești.

References

Rivers of Romania
Rivers of Bacău County